Susan King is an American journalist and currently the Dean and John Thomas Kerr Distinguished Professor at the Hussman School of Journalism and Media at University of North Carolina at Chapel Hill.

Education

King received a bachelor's degree in English from Marymount College in Tarrytown, New York in 1969. King then received a master's degree in mass communications from the Fairfield University in Fairfield, Connecticut in 1973, where she is currently a member of the Board of Trustees.

Career

King began her career working for Walter Cronkite and became an on-air reporter in Buffalo, New York. She then became both an anchor in Washington television and a political analyst known for cover story reports on politics, diplomacy and major issues of the day. She worked for ABC News and served as a White House correspondent during the Reagan administration. She has reported for CNN and served as host for CNBC's Equal Time, NPR's Talk of the Nation and WAMU's Diane Rehm Show.

King then worked in the administration of President Bill Clinton for five years as the Assistant Secretary for Public Affairs of the U.S. Department of Labor and as the Executive Director of the Family and Medical Leave Commission.

In 1999, King became the vice president for external affairs for the Carnegie Corporation of New York, where she launched and led the Carnegie-Knight Initiative on the Future of Journalism Education in collaboration with the John S. and James L. Knight Foundation and 12 premier U.S. journalism schools.

Awards
King has won numerous journalism awards including Emmys for her reporting from Lebanon and three National Women's Political Caucus awards. In 2014, King was inducted into the Buffalo Broadcasting Hall of Fame and honored with the Buffalo Bob Smith Award.

Bibliography

References

External links
Profile at UNC's Hussman School of Journalism and Media

Year of birth missing (living people)
Living people
Marymount College, Tarrytown alumni
Fairfield University alumni
University of North Carolina at Chapel Hill faculty